"All the Way" is a song published in 1957 by Maraville Music Corporation. The music was written by Jimmy Van Heusen with lyrics by Sammy Cahn.

Frank Sinatra recording
In 1957, a recording of "All the Way", was made famous by Frank Sinatra It was introduced in the film The Joker Is Wild. Sinatra also had the best-selling recorded version of the song. Aside from this song, he also sang "Chicago (That Toddlin' Town)" for the movie. It wound up as the flipside of "All the Way" when Capitol Records released the song as a single. The single reached #15 in sales and #2 in airplay in Billboard's charts. The track peaked at #3 in the UK Singles Chart.
The song in its orchestral arrangement by Nelson Riddle received the 1957 Academy Award for Best Original Song.
Sinatra rerecorded the song, with a Nelson Riddle arrangement, for his 1963 album Sinatra's Sinatra.

Translations
Mina performed "Si, amor", the Italian version of the song, in Canzonissima, a 1968 RAI musical variety series. Neil Sedaka also recorded "Si, amor" in the mid-1960s.

Cover versions

After the Frank Sinatra recording, "All the Way" has been covered since by many musicians, including:
Keely Smith - 1958 album Politely!
Etta Jones - 1960 album Don't Go to Strangers
Brenda Lee - 1961 album All the Way
Sam Cooke - 1963 album Mr. Soul
Marty Robbins - 1962 album Marty After Midnight
Bing Crosby - recorded the song for his radio show in 1957 and it was subsequently released on CD.
Trumpeter Lee Morgan played an instrumental version of the song on the album Candy, which was released November 1958.
Billie Holiday recorded a version of the song in March 1959, four months before her death, which is available on the album Last Recordings.
Neil Sedaka recorded the song for his big band album Circulate in 1961. This song has since appeared on other compilation albums of his.
A cover by James Brown & the Dee Felice Trio was released on their album Gettin' Down to It, in 1969.
New Birth recorded the song for their 1970 eponymous debut album as well as their Coming Together album in 1972.
Glen Campbell recorded the song for his album Try a Little Kindness in 1970.
Céline Dion performed "All The Way" in 1998-1999 as the final part of an acoustic medley during her Let's Talk About Love World Tour. She also recorded "All the Way" as a duet with Sinatra (using the vocals from his 1963 Reprise recording) on her 1999 compilation album All the Way… A Decade of Song and also performed the song in virtual duet in her Las Vegas show, A New Day.... This version of the song was nominated for a Grammy Award for Best Collaboration. She sang the song at the "Sinatra 100 — An All-Star GRAMMY Concert" in Las Vegas on December 6, 2015.
Lou Rawls released a version of the song on his 1977 album Unmistakably Lou.
A cover by Ray Price peaked at number 73 on the Billboard Hot Country Singles chart in 1986.
Jeffrey Osborne recorded a version of "All the Way" which was featured in the 1991 motion picture (and soundtrack) Dying Young, starring Julia Roberts. The soundtrack from Dying Young was composed and produced by James Newton Howard.
This song was covered by Richard Hell & the Voidoids as a track on their first album Blank Generation but was not used until the album was re-printed in the late 1990s.
Jimmy Scott recorded the song in his distinctive style on his album All the Way in 1992.
Joe Lovano included the song in his 1996 album Celebrating Sinatra.
James Darren recorded the song in 1999 for his album This One's From The Heart
The Italian singer Mina covered the song (in English) on the album-tribute to Frank Sinatra, L'allieva, in 2005.
Harry Connick, Jr. recorded the song for his 2009 album Your Songs.
Laura Dickinson recorded the song for her debut album One For My Baby - To Frank Sinatra With Love, which released on December 12, 2014, in celebration of Sinatra's 99th birthday.
Bobby Darin recorded the song in the 1960s, but it was not released until the 2004 album Aces Back to Back.
Iva Davies and his band Icehouse recorded it as part of the 1995 release of The Berlin Tapes.
Bob Dylan recorded the song as a country waltz for his 2016 album Fallen Angels.
Katharine McPhee recorded the song in 2017 for her album I Fall In Love Too Easily
Trisha Yearwood covered the song as part of her 2018 Frank Sinatra tribute album Let's Be Frank.
King Curtis and Nat Adderley recorded a version for Curtis's 1960 album, Soul Meeting.
James Darren, playing a hologram of a Vegas lounge singer, sang it on the Star Trek: Deep Space Nine episode "Image in the Sand", 1998

References

External links
Jimmy Van Heusen Website

1957 songs
1986 singles
Frank Sinatra songs
Ray Price (musician) songs
Best Original Song Academy Award-winning songs
Glen Campbell songs
Songs with music by Jimmy Van Heusen
Songs with lyrics by Sammy Cahn
Love themes
Capitol Records singles